Amagama is a debut studio album by South African singer and songwriter Nomfundo Moh, released on January 28, 2022, through Universal Music. It was produced by Martin Manqoba Sosibo. 

The album was certified gold in South Africa.

On August 12, 2022, Moh released a deluxe version of the album, titled  Amagama (Deluxe), which includes the original album's 13 tracks along with 4 new ones. With features from Sjava , and Kwesta.

Background 
Towards the end of 2020 Moh began working on her debut album and finished recording it in 2021.

In early January  2022, she revealed release date January 28, 2022, in an interview with Drum.

Composition 
The final 13-track standard edition of Amagama is an Afro-pop record.

4 bonus tracks were released on Deluxe Edition in August 2022.

Commercial performance 
Amagama was certified gold in South Africa.

Accolades 
Amagama won Best Afro-Pop Album at the 28th South African Music Awards, received a nominations for Album of the Year both  All Africa Music Awards and African Entertainment Awards USA.

!
|-
|rowspan="3"|2022
|rowspan="3"|Amagama
|Best Afro Pop Album
| 
|
|-
|Album of the Year
|
| 
|-
|Album of the Year 
|
|

Track listing

Personnel 
Credits are adapted from AllMusic.

 Nomfundo Moh - Composer, Primary Artist
 Martin Manqoba Sosibo - Producer

Certifications and sales

Releases and singles 
Amagama standard edition was released digitally on January 28, 2022. The is about 47 minutes and 22 second consisting of 13 tracks.

"Phakade Lami" featuring South African singer Ami Faku and Zimbabwean-born singer Sha Sha was released as third single on October 7, 2021. It debuted at number 1 on Metro FM Top 40 Charts and number 4 on Most Popular Radio Singles.

Release history

References 

2022 debut albums
Albums by South African artists
Universal Records albums